The Minerva Café was a cafe at 144 High Holborn in London's Holborn district. It was founded by the Women's Freedom League in 1916. The British Socialist Party and the Communist Workers Party of Sylvia Pankhurst also met at the cafe.

Constance Markievicz spoke at the cafe in February 1923 at a meeting of the Irish Self-Determination League. The Australian writer Miles Franklin worked as a cook at the cafe.

References

External links
Tableware from the Minerva Cafe

1916 establishments in England
1916 in London
Women's Freedom League
Women's suffrage in the United Kingdom
Restaurants in London
Defunct restaurants in London
Restaurants established in 1916